Strike pay is a payment made by a trade union to workers who are on strike to help in meeting their basic needs while on strike, often out of a special reserve known as a strike fund. Union workers reason that the availability of strike pay increases their leverage at the bargaining table and actually decreases the probability of a strike, since the employers are aware that their employees have this financial resource available to them if they choose to strike.

By countries

Spain
According to ELA, its fund received 13.7 million euros between 2008 and 2011, 15.1% of its expenses, and 19.1 M€ between 2012 and 2016 (16,24%).
It receives amounts to 25% of the dues of its members.

ELA-STV strikers can receive between 1,000 €/month (the minimum wage in Spain) and 1,243 €.
Another Basque union  provides a maximum of 30 €/day (900 €/month) after the second day of the strike.

Strikes funded by ELA-STV can become long: 235 days at Tubacex, 285 among the cleaners of the Guggenheim Bilbao Museum, over 1,000 days at Novaltia.

United Kingdom
Whilst some trade unions make payments to members who are on an official strike there is no requirement to do so. The UK Government makes the presumption that workers on official strike action are being paid strike pay, and so they may not be entitled to state benefits.

Strike fund 
A strike fund is a reserve set up by a union ahead of time (through special assessments or from general funds) and used to provide strike pay or for other strike-related activities.

Sources 
European Employment and Industrial Relations Glossaries Online

References

External links 
 Legamus audiorecording of "Strike-Pay" by D. H. Lawrence read by Martin Geeson.

Labor relations
Trade unions
Pay
Payments